Her Majesty's Theatre is a 1,700 seat theatre in Melbourne's East End Theatre District, Australia. Built in 1886, it is located at 219 Exhibition Street, Melbourne. It is classified by the National Trust of Australia and is listed on the Victorian Heritage Register.

Purchased in 2000 by Mike Walsh, the theatre was restored and refitted to accommodate larger productions.

History 
The first recorded use of the area near the corner of Stephen (now known as Exhibition) Street and Little Bourke Street as a venue for entertainment was in 1880, when tiered seating was constructed and an openair venue for circuses and equestrian shows established.

The Hippodrome lasted four years before the French born entrepreneur, Jules François de Sales Joubert, secured a 30-year lease on the site and commissioned architect Nahum Barnet to design a theatre, business and accommodation complex.

In 1886, work on Joubert's project was completed. On 1 October, the Alexandra Theatre opened. Named after the then Princess of Wales, wife of the future King Edward VII, the theatre was the largest in the Southern Hemisphere, boasting a capacity of 2,800. The very first show staged was the comedy, Bad Lads. Also in the first year, the Australian classic, For the Term of His Natural Life, was performed, as was Saturday afternoon wrestling and a season of Italian opera.

The early days of the "Alec" (as it became known) were problematic. Joubert had spent almost twice his original budget on construction and had been unable to obtain the required operating licences for the hotel, bars and cafes of the complex. By November 1887, he was insolvent.

Early in 1888, the renowned actor and playwright, Alfred Dampier, leased the theatre and introduced a successful programming and pricing formula. The "Alec" prospered.

In 1900, well-known expatriate American theatrical producer, James Cassius Williamson, took over the lease of the theatre and engaged architect William Pitt to supervise renovations. The stage was lowered by 60 centimetres and the stalls and orchestra pit raised by almost 30 centimetres. The Dress Circle was remodelled and new boxes added.
Seats were re-upholstered, re-painting carried out and a new stage curtain and new stage lighting installed. The theatre, re-vamped and re-christened Her Majesty's Theatre in honour of Queen Victoria, re-opened with a production of Gilbert and Sullivan’s HMS Pinafore on 19 May.

In 1909, after a private sound test, Dame Nellie Melba, by then an international star, declared that the theatre’s acoustics were "dead" and that she would not perform unless they were altered. Further renovations to the theatre's interior were carried out in time for Dame Nellie to hold her Australian opera debut in November 1911.

On 6 July 1913, J. C. Williamson – the biggest theatrical entrepreneur in the world at the time – died at the age of 68. As a mark of respect, all the Williamson theatres ‘were dark’ for one night, a rare tribute. The company he had established with Her Majesty's Theatre as its flagship however, continued to prosper, featuring the operettas of Gilbert and Sullivan as staple fare well into the 1920s.

The name change from the Alexandra to Her Majesty's Theatre occurred eight months before the death of Queen Victoria. The theatre management maintained the name despite there now being a King on the throne. In 1924, the theatre was renamed again as His Majesty's Theatre, this time in honour of King George V, after whose mother, the original theatre had been named. It would revert to "Her Majesty's" in May 1953, in time for the coronation of Elizabeth II.

Despite the changes in identity, the theatre consistently played host to the world's best artists and shows. The legendary Russian ballerina, Anna Pavlova, captivated Australian crowds at performances in 1926 and 1929.

Previous productions

Previous notable productions at Her Majesty's include:

References

External links

Theatres in Melbourne
Buildings and structures in Melbourne City Centre
Heritage-listed buildings in Melbourne
1886 establishments in Australia
Art Deco architecture in Melbourne
Landmarks in Melbourne